Hans Tost (1907–1958) was a German film producer and occasional actor. He headed his own production unit at Terra Film during the Nazi era. He was the younger brother of Walter Tost, also a film producer.

Selected filmography

Actor
 The Marriage Nest (1927)
 Three Days of Life and Death (1929)
 Student Life in Merry Springtime (1931)

Producer
 Five Million Look for an Heir (1938)
 Thirteen Chairs (1938)
 Target in the Clouds (1939)
 In the Name of the People (1939)
 The Governor (1939)
 Woman Made to Measure (1940)
 Goodbye, Franziska (1941)
 Beloved Darling (1943)
 Große Freiheit Nr. 7 (1944)
 The Disturbed Wedding Night (1950)
 White Shadows (1951)
 The Lady in Black (1951)
 Bonjour Kathrin (1956)

References

Bibliography 
 Henry Nicolella. Frank Wisbar: The Director of Ferryman Maria, from Germany to America and Back. McFarland, 2018.

External links 
 

1907 births
1958 deaths
German male film actors
German film producers
Film people from Berlin